Leionema westonii is a flowering plant in the family Rutaceae and is endemic to New South Wales. It has white flowers borne in upper leaf axils.

Description
The stems are covered with spreading, soft, fine, simple white hairs. Flowering occurs from late summer to autumn.

Taxonomy and naming
Leionema westonii was first formally described in 2018 and description was published in Telopea. The specific epithet (westonii) honours Peter Henry Weston a co-discoverer of the species in 2004.

Distribution and habitat
This leionema grows in woodland on shallow soils in the Oxley Wild Rivers National Park.

References

westonii
Sapindales of Australia
Flora of New South Wales